The 2008 Indiana gubernatorial election was held on November 4, 2008. Incumbent Republican nominee Mitch Daniels was challenged by Democratic nominee Jill Long Thompson and Libertarian nominee Andy Horning. Daniels easily won reelection, defeating Long Thompson by over 17 points. Despite Daniels' landslide victory, Barack Obama narrowly carried Indiana in the concurrent presidential election; the only Democratic candidate to do so since 1964.

Timeline 
May 6, 2008 – Democratic and Republican primary elections.

October 6, 2008 – Deadline for voter registration for the General election.

November 4, 2008 – General election.

Primaries

Democratic 

On the Democratic side, Indianapolis businessman Jim Schellinger and former U.S. Representative Jill Long Thompson announced their candidacies. Indiana Senate Minority Leader Richard Young also ran early, but dropped out of the race well before the primary. Schellinger raised over $1 million in campaign funds, with support of key Democratic officials such as former Indiana House Speaker John R. Gregg, former Indianapolis Mayor Bart Peterson and U.S. Representative Julia Carson. Long Thompson's support came from Democrats such as popular former U.S. Representative Andrew Jacobs, Jr. and former Indiana First Lady Maggie Kernan.

The contest was very close. The difference between the two was 13,769 votes out of over 1.1 million cast, a difference of 1.1%. Both Long Thompson and Schellinger won various counties from many different political geographies of the state. Schellinger narrowly beat Long Thompson in heavily populated Marion County, home of Indianapolis. Long Thompson trounced Schellinger in Allen County, home of Fort Wayne, the second most populous city in the state. Many attribute her very narrow statewide victory to her strong performance in Allen County. Schellinger also did well in Evansville and the Indianapolis suburbs. Long Thompson and Schellinger basically split the rural vote. It was one of the closest statewide primaries in state history, and also had the highest turnout of any Indiana non-presidential primary. Schellinger called Long Thompson around 5 a.m. the day after the election to concede. He pledged her his full support.

On June 16, Long Thompson announced that her running mate and the Democratic nominee for Lieutenant Governor would be longtime State Representative Dennie Oxley.

Republican 
On June 16, 2007, incumbent Governor Mitch Daniels announced he was running for reelection with his Lieutenant Governor Becky Skillman. He was unopposed in the Republican primary.

Libertarian 
Andy Horning, an engineer, Libertarian Party activist and frequent candidate, ran unopposed for his party's nomination. He appeared on the November ballot with Lisa Kelly as running mate.

General election

Debates
Three debates organized by the Indiana Debate Commission were held:
Tuesday, September 16 at the Star Plaza Theatre in Merrillville, Indiana
Tuesday, September 23 at the Jasper Arts Center in Jasper, Indiana
Tuesday, October 14 at the Indiana University Auditorium in Bloomington, Indiana, moderated by former Indianapolis broadcaster Tom Cochrun

Predictions

Polling

Polling had largely shown Daniels with a slight lead over both Long Thompson and Schellinger. Long Thompson later slipped further behind Daniels in most polls. In the last polls before the election, conducted by Public Policy Polling (November 2, 2008), Daniels led Long Thompson 60% to 37%.

Statewide results

County results
Daniels won 79 of Indiana's counties compared to 13 for Long Thompson.

References

External links
Elections from the Indiana Secretary of State
Indiana Governor candidates at Project Vote Smart
Indiana Governor race from OurCampaigns.com
Indiana Governor race from 2008 Race Tracker
Campaign contributions from Follow the Money
Daniels (R-i) vs Long Thompson (D) graph of collected poll results from Pollster.com
Official campaign websites (Archived)
Mitch Daniels, Republican incumbent nominee
Jill Long Thompson, Democratic nominee
Andy Horning, Libertarian nominee

2008 United States gubernatorial elections
2008
Gubernatorial